The 2020–21 South Dakota Coyotes men's basketball team represented the University of South Dakota during the 2020–21 NCAA Division I men's basketball season. The Coyotes, led by third-year head coach Todd Lee, played their home games at the Sanford Coyote Sports Center in Vermillion, South Dakota as members of the Summit League.

Previous season
The Coyotes finished the 2018–19 season 20–12, 10–6 in Summit League play to finish in third place. They lost in the quarterfinals of the Summit League tournament to North Dakota.

Roster

Schedule and results

|-
!colspan=9 style=| Non-conference Regular season

|-
!colspan=9 style=| Summit League Regular season

|-
!colspan=9 style=| Summit League tournament

Source

References

South Dakota Coyotes men's basketball seasons
South Dakota
Coyo
Coyo